Mesori (Masōri) is the twelfth month of the ancient Egyptian and Coptic calendars. It is identical to Nahase (Nähase) in the Ethiopian calendar.

Name

The ancient and Coptic month is also known as Mesore (Mesorḗ).

In ancient Egypt, the months were variously described. The month was also personified as the deity of its festival, which in late sources is given as Ra-Horakhty (Rꜥ Ḥr Ꜣḫty, "Ra–Horus of the Horizons").

The solar civil calendar borrowed the festivals of the earlier lunar calendar, though sometimes under other names. These festival names are increasingly attested after Egypt's Persian occupation. The most common name continued to be the "Opening of the Year", although its little-attested synonym "Birth of the Sun"  (Mswt Rꜥ) or  became the namesake of the Ptolemaic Greek and Coptic month.

In Egyptian Arabic, the Coptic month is known as Mesra .

The Ethiopian month is sometimes also transliterated Nehase, Nehasa, or Nehasie.

Egyptian calendars

Ancient

Until the  the beginning of the months of the lunar calendar were based on observation, beginning at dawn on the morning when a waning crescent moon could no longer be seen. The intercalary month was added every few years as needed to maintain the heliacal rising of Sirius within the month. According to the civil calendar, the month fell in order with the rest regardless of the state of the moon. It always consisted of 30 days, each individually named and devoted to a particular patron deity, and was always followed by an intercalary month, although it slowly cycled relative to the solar year and Gregorian date owing to the lack of leap days until the Ptolemaic and Roman eras.

Torches were ritually carried on the 28th day of the month in preparation for the spiritual danger of the intercalary month that followed.

New Year's Eve ( or ) was observed on the 30th day of the month.

Once the holidays were transferred to the civil calendar, Wep Renpet proper was celebrated on the first day of Thoth by at least the Middle Kingdom, though the last month of the year continued to bear its name. The holiday honored the birth and youth of the personification of the sun and its fight against evil. Royal artisans were freed from work, temples lit torches to banish darkness and its demons, spells concerning the crushing of enemies were cast, and ritual combat occurred during a "water procession" on temple lakes. People threw ink into water, cleansed themselves, and painted their eyes green. It was a common occasion for pharaonic coronations during the Middle Kingdom and the occasion of ceremonies of renewed kingship in other eras, occasioning his officials to present him with new year's gifts. This practice extended to commoners presenting gifts—such as rings, scarabs, and bottles inscribed "Happy New Year's" (Wpt Rnpt Nfrt)—to one another during the Saite Period.

In Ptolemaic Egypt, the festivities began on the last day of Mesori and ran through the first nine days of Thoth.

Coptic

In the present-day Coptic calendar, Mesori has fallen between August 7 and September 5 since AD1900 (1616) and will continue to do so until AD2100 (1816). In that year, the Gregorian calendar's lack of a leap day will cause the Coptic month to advance another day relative to it and it will run from August 8 to September 6. The Coptic liturgical calendar of the month consists of:

Ethiopian calendar

In the present-day Ethiopian calendar, Nahase is identical to the Coptic month of Mesori, falling between August 7 and September 5. It will also shift forward one day relative to the Gregorian calendar in AD2100 (2092).

See also
 Egyptian, Coptic, and Ethiopian calendars
 Islamic calendar

Notes

References

Citations

Bibliography
 .
 .
 .
 .
 .

Egyptian calendar
Months of the Coptic calendar
Ethiopian culture